Bürüs is a village in Baranya county, Hungary.

History
According to László Szita the settlement was completely Hungarian in the 18th century.

References

External links 
 Local statistics 

Populated places in Baranya County